The 14th Pan American Games were held in Santo Domingo, Dominican Republic from August 1 to August 17, 2003.

Medals

Silver

Women's 800 metres: Marian Burnett

Bronze

Women's 400 metres: Aliann Pompey

Results by event

Boxing

Swimming

Men's Competition

See also
Guyana at the 2004 Summer Olympics

References

Nations at the 2003 Pan American Games
Pan American Games
2003